John Roderick may refer to:

 John Roderick (American football), American football player
 John Roderick (correspondent), American journalist
 John Roderick (musician), member of the American bands The Long Winters and Harvey Danger
 John "Jack" Roderick, mayor of Anchorage, Alaska